Severe Tropical Cyclone Orson was the fourth most intense cyclone ever recorded in the Australian region. Forming out of a tropical low on 17 April 1989, Orson gradually intensified as it tracked towards the west. After attaining Category 5 intensity on 20 April, the storm began to track southward and accelerated. The following day, the cyclone reached its peak intensity with winds of  10-minute sustained) and a barometric pressure of 904 hPa (mbar). Orson maintained this intensity for nearly two days before making landfall near Dampier. The cyclone rapidly weakened after landfall as it accelerated to the southeast. After moving into the Great Australian Bight on 24 April, the storm dissipated.

Despite Orson's extreme intensity, damage was relatively minimal as it struck a sparsely populated region of Western Australia. The storm damaged a new gas platform, delaying the project for nearly two weeks. The most severe impacts took place in Pannawonica, where 70 homes were damaged. Following the storm, cleanup costs reached A$5 million (US$4.1 million). Due to the severity of the storm, the name Orson was retired after the season.

Meteorological history

Cyclone Orson originated out of a tropical low, monitored by the Australian Bureau of Meteorology, that formed northwest of Darwin, Northern Territory on 17 April 1989. The system tracked southwest throughout the day before turning due west and strengthening into a tropical cyclone, at which time it received the name Orson. At this time, the Joint Typhoon Warning Center (JTWC) also began monitoring the storm as Tropical Storm 28S. The forward motion of the storm gradually slowed as it intensified and on 19 April, Orson attained Category 3 status on the Australian tropical cyclone intensity scale, classifying Orson as a severe tropical cyclone. Later that day, as the storm attained Category 4 status, an eye developed. By this time, Orson began to turn towards the southwest and on 20 April, the storm intensified into a Category 5 cyclone with winds of  10-minute sustained).

The JTWC also reported significant strengthening during the same period. They assessed Orson to have attained an intensity equivalent to a Category 5 hurricane on the Saffir–Simpson hurricane scale on 22 April with winds of  1-minute sustained). Around this time, the storm tracked directly over the North Rankin gas platform. A weather station there recorded a barometric pressure of 904 hPa (mbar; 26.69 inHg) and wind gusts of  before the station was damaged. This was, at the time, the lowest pressure ever recorded in the Australian region since records began. It was later surpassed by Severe Tropical Cyclone Gwenda in 1999 when that storm attained a pressure of 900 hPa (mbar).

Continuing on a southerly track, accelerating ahead of an approaching cold front, Cyclone Orson made landfall, near Dampier, around 4:45 am AWST on 23 April (2045 UTC 22 April). with winds of  10-minute sustained). The JTWC also reported that Orson had weakened, with winds at landfall estimated at  1-minute sustained). Less than 12 hours after landfall, the storm weakened below Category 3 status. By this time, the JTWC was no longer monitoring the system. Around 5:00 am AWST on 24 April (2100 UTC 23 April), Orson weakened to a tropical low while situated over southern Western Australia. Several hours after moving back over water, the storm dissipated.

The Australian Bureau of Meteorology uses 10-minute sustained winds, while the Joint Typhoon Warning Center uses one-minute sustained winds. The conversion factor between the two is 1.14. The Bureau of Meteorology's peak intensity for Orson was  10-minute sustained, or  one-minute sustained. The JTWC's peak intensity for Orson was  one-minute sustained, or  10-minute sustained.

Preparations and impact
As Cyclone Orson approached the coast of Western Australia, residents were urged to prepare for the storm; people proceeded to clean up litter, secure outdoor items and make sure their disaster kits were stocked. All 200 personnel from a A$1.5 billion gas platform off the coast were evacuated ahead of the storm. Since Cyclone Orson made landfall in a sparsely populated region, its effects were relatively light compared to its intensity. More than 20 fishermen were reported missing during the storm.

On 23 April, a rescue mission with three aircraft recovered roughly 20 fisherman, while one was still missing. Offshore, the storm killed four Indonesian fishermen after their ships sank in swells up to  produced by the storm. The waves knocked a drill rig used to find oil out of position; it would take several days for the drill rig to be repositioned. The repositioning and cleanup of the drill rig delayed the project by nearly two weeks.

Harbour officials stated that several ships were knocked off their moorings and washed up onshore. In Karratha, the local weather radar sustained roughly A$900,000 (US$760,000) in damages. A nearby airport was also damaged. The jetty at Point Samson was severely damaged and eventually removed.

The most severe damage took place in the mining town of Pannawonica, where 70 homes were damaged by the storm. Numerous trees and power lines were downed along the storm's path. Before dissipating, the storm left one additional person missing after contact was lost with his yacht. Later reports confirmed that the missing person drowned during the storm. Twenty people were also injured during the storm, 60 were left homeless and about 1,000 were affected. Total damages from the storm were estimated at A$20 million (US$16.8 million) and repair costs reached A$5 million (US$4.1 million). Due to the severity of the storm, the name Orson was retired after the season.

See also

Australian region tropical cyclone
List of cyclones in Western Australia
List of the most intense tropical cyclones

References

External links

Track of Cyclone Orson (provided by Australia Severe Weather)

Orson, cyclone
Orson
Orson
Orson
Orson
1989 disasters in Australia